The Fuegian dog, also known as the Yahgan dog, is an extinct domesticated canid. It was a domesticated form of the culpeo (Lycalopex culpaeus). The culpeo is similar in build to true foxes (tribe Vulpini) but is actually more closely related to wolves and jackals, being placed in a separate genus within the South American foxes or zorros. The Fuegian dog is not descended from domestic dogs, which were domesticated from an ancestor shared with the modern gray wolf (Canis lupus), nor from the domesticated silver fox which was domesticated from a melanistic population of the red fox (Vulpes vulpes).

There are very few remaining specimens of the Fuegian dog. These include one in the Museo Salesiano Maggiorino Borgatello in Chile, and another in the Fagnano Regional Museum in Tierra del Fuego, Argentina.

Characteristics

Fuegian dogs had erect ears, sharp snout and a thick tail and were tawny-colored or entirely white.  Surviving images show them to be a similar size to the wild culpeo, which weighs , or roughly the size of a Shetland Sheepdog.   Gauchos called these foxes "maned dogs" because of their resemblance to the maned wolf. Lucas Bridges described the animals as like "a stunted cross between an Alsatian police dog and a wolf".

It was described by French navigator , who headed the 1883 scientific expedition to Cape Horn, as “ugly, with long tawny hair and a sharp snout, it looks quite like a fox".

Behaviour
Although the distribution of the Fuegian dog corresponded with that of the Yahgan people, individual animals were not loyal to their human owners. Julius Popper pointed out the canid's lack of loyalty: "I never saw them, no matter how large their number, take an aggressive attitude or defend their masters when these were in danger".

Uses
Fuegian dogs were not used to hunt guanaco. However, they might have been useful for hunting otters. The foxes were also useful to humans in that they would gather around their owners to keep them warm. This was noted by Julius Popper: "The dogs placed themselves in a group around the small Onas, taking the shape of a kind of wrapping .... [M]y opinion is that the Fuegian dogs are only useful to complete the defective garment of the Indian, or better, as the Ona's heating furniture".

Extermination
In 1919, when Silesian missionary Martin Gusinde visited the local Yahgans, he noticed that, to his knowledge, all of the dogs seemed to be missing. He immediately noted this as odd, especially considering that the tie between the dogs and the local people was well documented by foreign missionaries and explorers by this time. Indeed, this mutual cooperation allowed for the region to become the only stronghold of this unusual domesticated canine to have ever existed. Upon speaking to the local people and inquiring about what had happened to the animals, he was told that the entire known population of them had been exterminated, and it was claimed they "were dangerous to men and cattle". Apparently, this "fierce" nature of the animal was allegedly witnessed by Thomas Bridges in the 1880s, who in his writings, purported that the dogs attacked his mission's goats, while giving few specific details.

References

South American foxes
Mammals of Patagonia
Mammals of Argentina
Mammals of Chile
Fauna of Tierra del Fuego
Species made extinct by deliberate extirpation efforts
Mammal extinctions since 1500